A.J. Wentworth, B.A. is a British sitcom that aired on ITV in 1982. Set in the 1940s, the programme was shown posthumously following the death of its lead actor Arthur Lowe, who died on 15 April 1982. Based on the writings of H. F. Ellis, A.J. Wentworth, B.A. was written by Basil Boothroyd. It was made for the ITV network by Thames Television.

Plot
A.J. Wentworth, B.A. is set in the 1940s at Burgrove, a boys' preparatory school in Wilminister, in rural England. A.J. Wentworth is the mathematics master. He is very fond of the school but inefficient at disciplining his pupils who take advantage of his kind but haphazard nature. As in the books, Wentworth has very little self-awareness. The headmaster, the Rev Saunders, who is nicknamed 'Squid' by the boys, is a snob and the Matron is Wentworth's constant enemy.

Cast
Arthur Lowe as Mr Arthur James Wentworth, BA (Cantab) 
Harry Andrews as The Rev. R Gregory Saunders, MA (Oxon) 
Marion Mathie as Matron
Deddie Davies as Miss Coombes
Ronnie Stevens as Rawlinson
Michael Bevis as Gilbert
Marcus Evans as Mason
Alistair Callender as Anderson
Stephen Rooney as Atkins
Andrew McDonnell as Etheridge
Michael Underwood as Hillman
Paul Hawkins as Hopgood II
Simon Curry as Otterway
Halil Halil as Sapoulos
Benjamin Taylor as Trench

Production

Development
A.J. Wentworth, B.A. was adapted from the writings of H. F. Ellis, which first appeared in Punch. They were later published in two books, The Papers of A.J. Wentworth, B.A. and The Papers of A.J. Wentworth, B.A. (Ret'd), that were first published in 1949 and 1962 respectively. Arthur Lowe had also read out selections from the books in the daily literacy slot of Woman's Hour. 

A piece from A.J. Wentworth, B.A. was read out by Harry Andrews, who played the headmaster, at Arthur Lowe's memorial service.

Locations
The exterior location filming of the school took place at Box Hill School near Dorking in Surrey. In the opening credits, the junior pupils took part.

Episodes

Home media
The Complete Series of A.J. Wentworth, B.A. was released on DVD on 9 July 2012.

References
Mark Lewisohn, "Radio Times Guide to TV Comedy", BBC Worldwide Ltd, 2003
A.J. Wentworth, B.A. at British TV Comedy

External links
 
 

1980s British sitcoms
1982 British television series debuts
1982 British television series endings
ITV sitcoms
English-language television shows
Television shows produced by Thames Television
Television series by Fremantle (company)